Willis Street is a prominent street in the central business district of Wellington, the capital city of New Zealand. Along with Courtenay Place, Manners Street and Lambton Quay, the lower reaches of Willis Street form part of the "Golden Mile", Wellington's primary entertainment and retail district.

Willis Street is one of the four 'quarters' of downtown Wellington, the others being centred on the Cuba Quarter, Courtenay Place and Lambton Quay.

The two tallest buildings in Wellington, the Aon Centre (Wellington) (formerly known as BNZ Tower) and the Majestic Centre, are both located on Willis Street. There is a large number of heritage buildings registered by Heritage New Zealand in Willis Street, including St John's Church and Henry Pollen House.

References

Streets in Wellington City
Shopping districts and streets in New Zealand
Wellington Central, Wellington